Simcha Leiner (born 1989) is an American singer, composer and entertainer in the Contemporary Jewish religious music industry.

Career 
Leiner started singing at weddings in 2008. In 2014, he officially debuted his career with the release of his album Pischi Li. It was followed by two collaborative albums with Baruch Levine. He then released SL2 in 2015, followed by Merakeid in 2017, and Kol Hakavod in 2019. Kol Hakavod was produced by Leiner himself.

Leiner is an advocate against bullying . In 2019, he released a single titled "Stand Up for Each Other" about the topic.

Discography
Pischi Li (2014)
SL2 (2015)
Merakeid (2017)
Kol Hakavod (2019)
Home (2022)

References 

1989 births
Living people
People from Monsey, New York
American Orthodox Jews
Jewish American musicians
Jewish songwriters
21st-century American Jews
Orthodox pop musicians